The HDL Universal Tactical Role-Playing System is a role-playing game system produced by Teamwork LLC.

Details 
HDL is a flexible, simple system of rules that are adaptable to a great number of settings, allowing them to be used as alternate rules for existing games or as a mechanic for running campaigns of your design. HDL's focus is on simplicity and realism. To play, all you need is the main book (a small and inexpensive volume as compared to many others), a set of HDL cards, and a few dice. There is no need to purchase a slew of “required” supplemental information; everything you need is in one book.

Character creation is point-based; allocate 65 points to stats, ranging from 1 to 10, and 5 points to Backgrounds. Additional Background Points can be gained by taking Weaknesses. Skill Points are determined by the top three mental stats: Reason, Knowledge, and Resolve. The final step is to draw a Background Card, to help fill in some aspect of the character's background or past.

The gameplay is almost entirely skill-based, with a very detailed skill list across several categories, such as Combat, Computer, and Technical: Design.

Experience Points (EXP) are awarded to players each game session, through role-playing, overcoming challenges, and playing Game Cards. EXP is then spent to improve the character's skills or stats, and can also be used to re-roll poor dice rolls.

The HDL namesake originates from the dice mechanic for the game, called the Half Die Level. For simplicity, all variables boil down to a simple number, which determines the die rolled. The number equals half the sides on the die. Thus, HDL 2 = 1d4, HDL 6 = 1d12, and HDL 10 = 2d10. In general, all rolls are based on an HDL equal to a certain stat, plus the character's rating in the associated skill. For instance, attacking with a sword is based on gross motor coordination or the Coordination stat, and the Sword: Slashing skill, so a character would roll the HDL of his Coordination, then add his Sword: Slashing skill.

With the emphasis on realism, and a greater focus on role-playing than dice-rolling and fighting, combat is intentionally quick and deadly; even the strongest enemy (or character) can still be felled by a well-placed
bullet or sword strike. Racking up a body count, or accumulating wealth, are secondary to the story and
characters. In this way, power-gamers quickly learn the benefits of negotiation and skill diversity, rather than the ability to smash down any obstacle or opponent. At the same time, the system is designed to help the players succeed; the Narrator is encouraged to challenge players, but in the end, they are expected to survive and, ultimately, win.

ESPers are another focus of the main rules: people with incredible psychic powers. Built using Background and special skills, ESPers have a wide range of paranormal abilities, including mind-reading, telekinesis, and even teleportation. The ESPer rules can also be adapted for use as magical abilities in fantasy settings.

For wargame players, strategic hex-map based tactical combat is possible with the optional SCom rules. This optional addition to standard combat rules uses a point-based action system that is simple yet deeply strategic. With this system, direct competitive play is even possible.

External links
 Tremorworks Website
 More Info on the HDL System
 HDL System Review from RPG.net
 HDL System Review from flamesrising.com

Role-playing game systems